Serrasalmus elongatus is a slender and elongated shaped piranha from the S. humeralis group. It is commonly known as elongated piranha or pike piranha in reference to its shape. In its native range it is one of the smaller piranha species locally termed caribe pinche ("mediocre piranha"), like the iridescent piranha (S. irritans). This term gave rise to various trade names, like "Pingke piranha" and "Serrasalmus pinke" which is not a proper scientific name.

Adult S. elongatus are found in deep, white water and juveniles are in usually shallow black waters of lagoons.

In the aquarium
Serrasalmus elongatus are notorious fin biters and should be kept in their own tank. They are illegal to keep in Alabama and many other states.

Serrasalmidae
Piranhas
Fish described in 1858